Charles de Gaulle (1890–1970) was a French military leader and statesman.

Charles de Gaulle may also refer to:

People
Charles de Gaulle (poet) (1837–1880), poet and pioneer of pan-Celticism, uncle of the statesman
Charles de Gaulle (born 1948), former member of the European Parliament, grandson of the statesman

Other
Charles de Gaulle Airport, the main airport serving Paris
, an aircraft carrier in the French Navy
Place Charles de Gaulle, a large urban junction in Paris, including the Arc de Triomphe
Charles de Gaulle – Étoile (Paris Métro and RER), a rail station under the place Charles de Gaulle
Charles de Gaulle Square, a square in Bucharest, Romania
Lycée Français Charles de Gaulle, a large French school in London

See also
 List of things named after Charles de Gaulle

De Gaulle, Charles